The Shakespeare Bridge in the Franklin Hills neighborhood of Los Angeles, California, was built in 1926. It is made of concrete and decorated in a Gothic style. It was named after William Shakespeare and later designated a Los Angeles Historic-Cultural Monument #126 in 1974.

The bridge was rebuilt in 1998 after the Northridge earthquake due to concerns that the structure would not be stable in the event of an earthquake in the Franklin Hills area. As part of the seismic retrofit, the deck, sidewalks and railings were removed and reconstructed using reinforced concrete.  The expansion joints were also removed, so the bridge deck is now a one-piece structural diaphragm built to transfer all seismic forces into the abutment walls at either end of the bridge. All of the rebuilding was done in to preserve the historic appearance of the bridge.

See also
List of bridges documented by the Historic American Engineering Record in California

References

Historic Bridges of Los Angeles County
Beau Bridges on Shakespeare Bridge

External links

Bridges in Los Angeles County, California
Concrete bridges in California
Los Feliz, Los Angeles
Los Angeles Historic-Cultural Monuments
Bridges completed in 1926
1926 establishments in California
Historic American Engineering Record in California
Gothic Revival architecture in California
Open-spandrel deck arch bridges in the United States
Road bridges in California